The Roman Catholic Diocese of Zhouzhi/Chowchich is a diocese located in Zhouzhi (Shaanxi) in the Ecclesiastical province of Xi’an in China.

History
 June 17, 1932: Established as the Apostolic Prefecture of Zhouzhi 盩厔 from the Apostolic Vicariate of Xi’anfu 西安府
 May 10, 1951: Promoted as Diocese of Zhouzhi 盩厔

Leadership
 Bishops of Zhouzhi 盩厔 (Roman rite)
 Bishop Joseph Wu Qinjing (2005–present)
 Bishop Alphonsus Yang Guang-yan (1995 - 2005)
 Bishop Paul Fan Yu-fei (1982 - 1984)
 Bishop Louis Li Bo-yu (李伯漁) (May 10, 1951 – February 8, 1980)
 Prefects Apostolic of Zhouzhi 盩厔 (Roman Rite)
 Fr. John Gao Zheng-yi (Kao) (高正一) (May 30, 1941 – 1951)
 Fr. John Zhang Zhi-nan (Tchang) (張指南) (June 14, 1932 – 1940)

References

 GCatholic.org
 Catholic Hierarchy

Roman Catholic dioceses in China
Christian organizations established in 1932
Roman Catholic dioceses and prelatures established in the 20th century
Christianity in Shaanxi